Goce Ojleski (born 10 October 1989) is a Macedonian handball player for RK Eurofarm Pelister and the Macedonian national team.

References

1989 births
Living people
Macedonian male handball players
Sportspeople from Struga
Macedonian expatriate sportspeople in Romania
Expatriate handball players
Mediterranean Games competitors for North Macedonia
Competitors at the 2018 Mediterranean Games